This is a list of schools in Caerphilly County Borough in Wales.

Primary schools 

Aberbargoed Primary School
Abertysswg Primary School
Abercarn Primary School
Bedwas Infants School
Bedwas Junior School
Blackwood Primary School
Bryn Awel Primary School
Bryn Primary School
Cefn Fforest Primary School
Coed Y Brain Primary School
Crumlin High Level Primary School
Cwmaber Infants School
Cwmaber Junior School
Cwmcarn Primary School
Cwmfelinfach Primary School
Cwm Glas Infants School
Cwm Ifor Primary School
Cwrt Rawlin Primary School
Deri Primary School
Derwendeg Primary School
Fleur de Lys Primary School
Fochriw Primary School 
Gilfach Fargoed Primary School
Glyn Gaer Primary School
Graig-y-Rhacca Primary School
Greenhill Primary School
Hendredenny Park Primary School
Hendre Infants School
Hendre Junior School
Hengoed Primary School
Idris Davies School 3-18
Libanus Primary School
Llancaeach Junior School
Llanfabon Infants School
Machen Primary School
Maesycwmmer Primary School
Markham Primary School
Nant Y Parc Primary School
Pantside Primary School
Park Primary School
Pengam Primary School
Penllwyn Primary School
Pentwynmawr Primary School
Phillipstown Primary School
Plasyfelin Primary School
Pontllanfraith Primary School
Rhiw Syr Dafydd Primary School
Rhydri Primary School
Risca Primary School
St Gwladys Bargoed School
St Helens RC Primary School
St James' Primary School
The Twyn School
Tir-y-Berth Primary School
Trinant Primary School
Ty Isaf Infants School
Tynewydd Primary School
Tyn-y-Wern Primary School
Ty Sign Primary School
 Upper Rhymney Primary School
Waunfawr Primary School
 White Rose Primary School
Ynysddu Primary School
Ystrad Mynach Primary School

Welsh medium primary schools 
Ysgol Gymraeg Bro Allta
Ysgol Gymraeg Cwm Derwen
Ysgol Gymraeg Cwm Gwyddon
Ysgol Gymraeg Trelyn
Ysgol Gymraeg Gilfach Fargod
Ysgol Gynradd Gymraeg Caerffili
Ysgol Gynradd Gymraeg Y Castell
Ysgol Bro Sannan
Ysgol Ifor Bach
Ysgol Penalltau
Ysgol Y Lawnt

Secondary schools 
Bedwas High School
Blackwood Comprehensive School
Heolddu Comprehensive School
Idris Davies School 3-18
Islwyn High School
Lewis Girls' Comprehensive School
Lewis School, Pengam
Newbridge Comprehensive School
Risca Community Comprehensive School
St Cenydd Comprehensive School
St Martin's Comprehensive School

- - -

Oakdale Comprehensive School and Pontllanfraith Comprehensive School have both amalgamated to form Islwyn High School 1.

Rhymney Comprehensive School - has now amalgamated with Abertysswg Primary School, and the new name is Idris Davies School 3-18

Welsh medium secondary schools 
Ysgol Gyfun Cwm Rhymni

Special school & Alternative Provision

Trinity Fields Special School

- -

Cefn Fforrest Primary School - Speech and Language Class included.
Coed Y Bryn Primary School - Special Resource Base attached. 
Cwm Ifor Primary School - Satellite Class attached.
Cwmcarn Primary School - Special Resource Base attached. 
Deri Primary School - Satellite Class attached.
Greenhill Primary School - Special Resource Base.
Pantside Primary School - ASD Base Attached.
 Pontllanfraith Primary - ASD Base attached.
St. James Primary School - Special Resource Base attached.
Tir-y-Beryth Primary School - Speech and Language Class included. 
Ty-Sign Primary School - Special Resource Base attached. 
Ty-y-Wern Primary School - Special Resource Base attached. 
Ynysddu Primary School - Nuture Class Reception and Yr 1. Social Inclusion Class Yrs 3 and 4.
Ysgol Gymraeg Cwm Derwen - Special Resource Base attached. (Welsh language.)
- - 
Islwyn High School - Special Resource Base attached. 
 Risca Community Comprehensive School - Special Resource Base attached. 
St. Cenydd School - hearing impaired base and Special Resource Base attached. 

- -

 The Learning Centre, Glan-Y-Nant PRU, Caerphilly 

</ref> 2. 

 
Caerphilly

Independent Schools

ACT Schools Caerphilly age range 11-16
 Mynydd Haf Independent School
 Wycliff Independent Christian School

Reference

1. Oakdale School and Pontllanfraith closing - article in the Caerphilly Observer (article last updated: Fri 17th Jun 2014.)
2. - Caerphilly Council - Additional Learning Needs (ALN) Policy - 2020-2022

External Links

  Caerphilly Council website - Schools finder